"Love Comes Again" is a song by Dutch DJ Tiësto featuring vocals by BT. It was released on 8 April 2004 as the second single from Tiësto's second studio album Just Be. It was written by Brian Transeau and Tiësto. In exchange to the collaboration of BT in his album, Tiësto remixed that same year one of BT's songs, "Force of Gravity" (from BT's album Emotional Technology) and was released on The Technology EP. Australian releases of "Love Comes Again" under Bang On! Recordings contain a B-side which was previously released as a single, known as "Traffic".

Formats and track listings

CD, maxi singles
Netherlands maxi-single
 "Love Comes Again" 
 "Love Comes Again" 
 "Love Comes Again 

Germany maxi-single
 "Love Comes Again" 
 "Love Comes Again" 
 "Love Comes Again 
 "Traffic" 

United Kingdom maxi-single
 "Love Comes Again" 
 "Love Comes Again" 
 "Love Comes Again 
 "Love Comes Again" 
 "Love Comes Again" 

Switzerland single
 "Love Comes Again" 
 "Love Comes Again" 

Australia maxi-single
 "Love Comes Again" 
 "Love Comes Again" 
 "Love Comes Again 
 "Traffic" 
 "Traffic" 
 "Traffic"

12" vinyl

Magik Muzik 12" vinyl
 "Love Comes Again" 
 "Love Comes Again" 

Media Records 12" vinyl
 "Love Comes Again" 
 "Love Comes Again" 
 "Traffic" 

Kontor Records, Nebula, Nettwerk America, Independence Records 12" vinyl
 "Love Comes Again" 
 "Love Comes Again" 

Sirup 12" vinyl
 "Love Comes Again" 
 "Love Comes Again" 
 "Love Comes Again" 

Bang On! 12" vinyl
 "Love Comes Again" 
 "Love Comes Again" 
 "Traffic" 
 "Traffic"

"Love Comes Again" and "Traffic"
Australia 12" vinyl
 "Love Comes Again" 
 "Love Comes Again" 
 "Traffic" 
 "Traffic" 

Australia maxi-single
 "Love Comes Again" 
 "Love Comes Again" 
 "Love Comes Again" 
 "Traffic" 
 "Traffic" 
 "Traffic"

Charts

Weekly charts

Year-end charts

Official versions
 Radio Edit – (3:15)
 Original 12" Version – (8:07)
 Mark Norman Remix – (7:20)
 Album Version – (8:06)
 Instrumental – (8:08)
Myon and Shane 54 Monster Mix – (6:32) 
 Hardwell 2011 Rework – (7:43)

Release history

References

Tiësto songs
2004 songs
Songs written by Tiësto
BT (musician) songs